El Hawawish is the ancient necropolis (cemetery) for the city of Akhmim in the 9th Nome of Upper Egypt (UE09), in modern the Sohag Governorate, Egypt.

History

Old Kingdom and First Intermediate Period 
The local deity of El Hawawish was the fertility and productivity god Min, similar to nearby Akhmim.

Tombs of the Old Kingdom and First Intermediate Period are located in the El Hawawish mountain.

 Name not preserved (J 2), FIP
 Tjeti (I 49) 9th Dynasty
 Kheni-ankhu (H 15) 8/9/10th dynasty
 Rehu-Rausen (BA 17) 10th Dynasty
 Bawi (BA 14) 10th Dynasty

Archaeology
The cemetery was excavated extensively by an Australian archaeological and epigraphic expedition under the auspices of the Australian Centre for Egyptology and Macquarie University and the direction of Professor Naguib Kanawati.

See also
 List of ancient Egyptian sites, including sites of temples

Bibliography 
 Naguib Kanawati, with contributions by Ann McFarlane, Colin Hope, Nabil Charoubim, John Curro, Naguib Maksoud, Reece Scannell, Elizabeth Thompson, Naguib Victor, Gaye Wilson, The Rock Tombs of El-Hawawish: The Cemetery of Akhmim, Volumes I–X, (The Ancient History Documentary Research Centre, Sydney, 1980–1992).
 (Australian Centre for Egyptology Studies: 2) Naguib Kanawati, with a Chapter by Ann McFarlane, Akhmim in the Old Kingdom, Part I: Chronology and Administration, (Sydney, 1992). .

References

External links
 Meketre.org, list of tombs

Archaeological sites in Egypt
Cemeteries in Egypt
Archaeological discoveries with year of discovery missing